A Snow Capped Christmas (broadcast as Falling for Christmas in the United States) is a 2016 Canadian Christmas romantic drama television film directed by Christie Will Wolf and starring Leah Renee, Niall Matter, Michael Teigen, Lisa Whelchel and Gracyn Shinyei. It premiered in Canada on W Network on November 6, 2016, and in the United States on Up Network on November 26, 2016.

Plot
Claire Benson is a figure skater who is broken on the inside and out. Driven to the brink by her coach, she is forced to spend the weeks leading up to Christmas in the picturesque mountain regions of Western Canada at a sports rehabilitation center. While resting, Claire meets Luke, a single father and former Canadian hockey player. Forced to retire early from the game due to an injury, Luke now spends his time raising his daughter while running the local ice fishing and tackle shop. This unlikely duo locks horns only to discover they have more in common than they thought. A true man of the Canadian north, Luke teaches Claire all the activities that personify a Canadian winter—from snowmobiling and ice fishing to chopping down a real Christmas tree for the holidays.

On her part, Claire encourages Luke—who has not played a game of hockey since being forced to retire—back onto the ice. Together with his former hockey teammates, Luke rouses the town's Christmas spirit when, on Christmas Eve, they engage in a truly Canadian tradition of playing a game of hockey on the ice covered lake. Luke and his daughter's Christmas is complete when Claire returns to the mountains having learned that there is more to life than competition.

Cast
 Leah Renee as Claire Benson
 Niall Matter as Luke
 Michael Teigen as Jullian, Claire's coach
 Gracyn Shinyei as Chamonix
 Lisa Whelchel as Dale, Claire's mother
 Lochlyn Munro as Lou
 Blaine Anderson as Greg, Claire's father
 Kathryn Kirkpatrick as Dr. Schmidt

Production
A Snow Capped Christmas was filmed from February 1 to March 5, 2016, in the Okanagan wilderness at Manning Park and Maple Ridge in British Columbia, Canada. The film was produced by Qube films.

Reception
Westword calls the film a "cinematic meditation on sports psychology, career-ending injuries and, of course, the Christmas spirit." Country Living included it in its list of "30 Best Christmas Movies" in 2021.

See also
 List of Christmas films

References

External links
 
 

2016 television films
2016 films
2016 romantic drama films
2010s Christmas drama films
Canadian Christmas drama films
Canadian drama television films
Canadian ice hockey films
Canadian romantic drama films
Christmas television films
Figure skating films
Films set in British Columbia
Films shot in British Columbia
Romance television films
W Network original programming